Sandhana Kaatru is a 1990 Indian Tamil language action film directed by Manivannan. The film stars Vijayakanth and Gautami. It was released on 1 June 1990.

Plot

The film begins with Azhagiri (Vijayakanth) in serious condition in a hospital because he was shot by the police.

In the past, he was a military officer who married Raasathi (Gautami). After spending a few years in a military camp, Azhagiri rejoined his wife and daughter. They shifted to Ramu's (R. Sarathkumar) house. Ramu was Azhagiri's friend and his superior Chakravarthy's (Vinu Chakravarthy) son. A few years ago, Ramu teased Raasathi, and he was beaten for this act along with his friends Viswanath (Vichu Vishwanath) and Vijay (Vijay Krishnaraj). They cannot forget the humiliation, so they tried to rape Raasathi, but she committed suicide before. Azhagiri first killed Viswanath in a public place and was therefore arrested for the crime and was sentenced to the death penalty. The day before his penalty, he escaped from jail, but the police found him and shot him.

Azhagiri is now cured and sees Vijay in the same hospital, who was also a patient. Azhagiri then begged the police to stay in the hospital for few more days. Thereafter, he smoothly killed Vijay without anyone suspecting him. Azhagiri then managed to escape from the hospital with the nurse's help. Azhagiri is now determined to kill Ramu before the police catch him.

Cast

Vijayakanth as Azhagiri
Gautami as Raasathi
R. Sarathkumar as Ramu
Sarath Babu as Dr. Sarath
Vinu Chakravarthy as Chakravarthy
Vichu Vishwanath as Viswanath
Vijay Krishnaraj as Vijay
Vaishnavi as Shanthi
Kitty
Kovai Sarala
Ganthimathi
Disco Shanti
S. S. Chandran
Periya Karuppu Thevar
Vasu
Kokila as Arukkani
Sakthivel
Babloo Prithiveeraj
Ilavarasu (uncreditted role)

Soundtrack
The music was composed by Shankar–Ganesh, with lyrics written by Vaali, Karaikudi Venkatesh and Jeeva Bharathi.

Reception
C. R. K. of Kalki said the first half of the film has too many songs due to less scenes while second half travels in the path of blood and violence.

References

1990 films
1990s Tamil-language films
Films scored by Shankar–Ganesh
Indian action films
Indian films about revenge
Films directed by Manivannan
1990 action films